CCLV may refer to:

 255 in Roman numerals
 255 (number)
 Circus Circus Las Vegas

Disambiguation pages